Jay Robbins may refer to:
Jay M. Robbins (born 1945), American racehorse trainer
Jay T. Robbins (1919–2001), U.S. Air Force General

See also
J. Robbins, rock music artist